Qissa Meherbano Ka is a 2021 Pakistani television series premiered on 28 August 2021 on Hum TV. It is directed by Iqbal Hussain, written by Fakhra Jabeen and produced by Momina Duraid under MD Productions. The serial stars Mawra Hocane, Ahsan Khan, Zaviyar Nauman Ijaz and Mashal Khan as lead roles while Zaib Rehman, Syed Mohammad Ahmed, Ghazala Kaifee, Khushhal Khan and Areej Mohyudin in supporting roles.

Cast 
 Mawra Hocane as Meherbano
 Ahsan Khan as Muraad
 Zaviyar Nauman Ijaz as Mehraan
 Mashal Khan as Fari
 Syed Mohammad Ahmed as Asghar Ali Mehtaab
 Zaib Rehman as Afiya and Murad's mother
 Ghazala Kaifee as Ghazala
 Laila Zuberi as Safiya
 Areej Mohyudin as Noor
 Isha Khan as Sarah
 Khushhal Khan as Ayaz
 Mahrunisa Iqbal as Eman
 Hassan Noman as Achhay Mian
 Waqas Shahzad as Atif
 Sadia Farooq as Afiya
 Faiza Azeem as Mehru's aunt
 Sahir Jahangir

Production

Background and development
In mid-June 2021, Zaviyar Nauman Ijaz, son of veteran actor Nauman Ijaz revealed that he is going to make his television debut and it will be a produced by MD Productions. Later, Hocane also announced being a part of the serial through her Instagram account in late June 2021. The principal photography began in same month in Islamabad. The series is directed by Iqbal Ansari who previously directed Zebaish and Deewar-e-Shab for the same production house.

References

External links 
Official website

2021 Pakistani television series debuts
2022 Pakistani television series endings